Michael Carrera (born 7 January 1993) is a Venezuelan professional basketball player for Gran Canaria of the Spanish Liga ACB.

College career
Carrera played college basketball for South Carolina. During his time there he averaged 14.5 points, 7.7 rebounds and 1.1 assists per game.

Professional career
In the 2016-2017 basketball season, Carrera played for the Russian side BC Avtodor Saratov where he averaged 7 points, 4.6 rebounds and 1.1 assists per game. He moved to the Australian side Cairns Taipans in 2017 where he averaged 14.3 points, 3.6 rebounds and 1 assists per contest. He moved to the NBA G League side Oklahoma City Blue in late 2017 where he averaged 7 points, 4.2 rebounds and 0.6 assists per game. He moved to the Argentine side Obras Sanitarias in 2018 where he averaged 6.9 points, 4.9 rebounds and 0.4 assists per game.

On September 19, 2019, he has signed with Brose Bamberg of the Basketball Bundesliga (BBL).

On November 26, 2019, he signed with another club BBL club, Hamburg Towers. Carrera averaged 13.3 points and 5.0 rebounds per game for the Towers in 2019-20.

On October 17, 2020, Carrera signed with Supersonicos de Miranda of the Venezuelan SuperLiga Profesional de Baloncesto. On July 14, 2021, Carrera signed with Força Lleida of the LEB Oro.

On March 15, 2023, he signed with Gran Canaria of the Spanish Liga ACB.

Venezuela National team
Carrera represents the Venezuela national basketball team. He represented the team at 2019 FIBA Basketball World Cup where he averaged 10 points, 5 rebounds and 1 assist at the tournament.

References

1993 births
Living people
BC Avtodor Saratov players
Brose Bamberg players
Cairns Taipans players
Força Lleida CE players
Guaiqueríes de Margarita players
Hamburg Towers players
Obras Sanitarias basketball players
Oklahoma City Blue players
Pan American Games 3x3 basketball players
People from Barcelona, Venezuela
Power forwards (basketball)
South Carolina Gamecocks men's basketball players
Venezuelan expatriate basketball people in Argentina
Venezuelan expatriate basketball people in Australia
Venezuelan expatriate basketball people in Germany
Venezuelan expatriate basketball people in Russia
Venezuelan expatriate basketball people in the United States
Venezuelan men's basketball players